Panagiotopoulos or Panayotopoulos is a Greek surname, meaning "son of Panagiotis". The feminine form is Panagiotopoulou/Panayotopoulou (Παναγιωτοπούλου). Notable people with the surname include:

Diamantis Panagiotopoulos (born 1967), Greek archaeologist
Georgios Panagiotopoulos (born 1969), Greek sprinter
Marie Panayotopoulos-Cassiotou (born 1952), Greek politician
Nicos Panayotopoulos (born 1963), Greek journalist, screenwriter and novelist
Panos Panagiotopoulos (born 1957), Greek politician
Georgios Panagiotopoulos (politician) (born in 1930), Greek politician 

Greek-language surnames
Surnames
Patronymic surnames